Stemmops is a genus of comb-footed spiders that was first described by Octavius Pickard-Cambridge in 1894.

Species
 it contains twenty-seven species, found mostly in the Americas, though several species occur in east Asia:
Stemmops belavista Marques & Buckup, 1996 – Brazil
Stemmops bicolor O. Pickard-Cambridge, 1894 (type) – USA to Panama, Cuba, Bahama Is.
Stemmops cambridgei Levi, 1955 – Mexico, Honduras
Stemmops carajas Santanna & Rodrigues, 2018 – Brazil
Stemmops caranavi Marques & Buckup, 1996 – Bolivia
Stemmops carauari Santanna & Rodrigues, 2018 – Brazil
Stemmops carius Marques & Buckup, 1996 – Brazil
Stemmops concolor Simon, 1898 – St. Vincent
Stemmops cryptus Levi, 1955 – Panama
Stemmops forcipus Zhu, 1998 – China, Laos
Stemmops guapiacu Santanna & Rodrigues, 2018 – Brazil
Stemmops lina Levi, 1955 – Mexico
Stemmops mellus Levi, 1964 – Panama
Stemmops murici Santanna & Rodrigues, 2018 – Brazil
Stemmops nigrabdomenus Zhu, 1998 – China, Laos
Stemmops nipponicus Yaginuma, 1969 – Russia (Far East), China, Korea, Japan
Stemmops ornatus (Bryant, 1933) – USA
Stemmops orsus Levi, 1964 – Panama, Brazil
Stemmops osorno (Levi, 1963) – Chile
Stemmops pains Santanna & Rodrigues, 2018 – Brazil
Stemmops questus Levi, 1955 – Mexico to Venezuela
Stemmops salenas Marques & Buckup, 1996 – Brazil
Stemmops satpudaensis Rajoria, 2015 – India
Stemmops servus Levi, 1964 – Panama, Brazil
Stemmops subtilis (Simon, 1895) – Venezuela
Stemmops vicosa Levi, 1964 – Brazil
Stemmops victoria Levi, 1955 – Mexico

In synonymy:
S. darlingtoni Bryant, 1940 = Stemmops bicolor O. Pickard-Cambridge, 1894
S. orniceps (Chamberlin & Ivie, 1944) = Stemmops ornatus (Bryant, 1933)

See also
 List of Theridiidae species

References

Further reading

Araneomorphae genera
Spiders of Asia
Spiders of North America
Spiders of South America
Taxa named by Octavius Pickard-Cambridge
Theridiidae